Malong District is a district of the city of Qujing, Yunnan province, China.

Administrative divisions
Malong District has 5 subdistricts, 2 towns and 3 townships. 
5 subdistricts

2 towns
 Maguohe
 Nazhang
3 townships
 Maming
 Dazhuang
 Yuewang

Climate

References

External links
Malong County Official Website

County-level divisions of Qujing